Thomas Langley (–1437) was an English catholic bishop.

Thomas Langley is also the name of:
Thomas Langley (priest) (died 1581), English Anglican canon at Winchester Cathedral
Tommy Langley (born 1958), English professional association football player
Sir Thomas Langley, 4th Baronet (died 1762), of the Langley baronets (of Higham Gobion)